The 2002 California gubernatorial election was an election that occurred on November 5, 2002. Democrat Gray Davis defeated Republican Bill Simon by 5% and was re-elected to a second four-year term as Governor of California. Davis would be recalled less than a year into his next term.

The 2002 gubernatorial primary occurred in March 2002. Gray Davis faced no major competitor in the primary and won the nomination. Simon defeated former Los Angeles Mayor Richard Riordan in the Republican primary. Gray Davis ran a series of negative ads against Riordan in the primary. Riordan was seen as a moderate and early state polls showed him defeating Gray Davis in the general election.

Primaries
During the 2002 election campaign, Davis took the unusual step of taking out campaign ads during the Republican primaries against Los Angeles mayor Richard Riordan. Davis claimed that Riordan had attacked his record and that his campaign was defending his record. Polls showed that, as a moderate, Riordan would be a more formidable challenger in the general election than a conservative candidate. Polls even showed that Riordan would defeat Davis. Davis attacked Riordan with negative ads in the primary. The ads questioned Riordan's support of anti-abortion politicians and judges. The ads pointed out Riordan's position of wanting a moratorium on the death penalty as being to the left of Gray Davis, who strongly supported it.

In 2000, the United States Supreme Court in California Democratic Party v. Jones struck down California's blanket primary. With the end of the blanket primary, only non-partisans and registered Republicans could vote for Richard Riordan in the 2002 primary. The end of the blanket primary made it more difficult for the more moderate Riordan. It has long been known in politics that primary voters are much more ideological and strongly liberal or strongly conservative than those who vote in the general election.

Additionally, the Republican primary included negative attacks between Bill Jones and Riordan. Jones highlighted in his attack ads against Riordan that Riordan had contributed money to Davis in past campaigns and had called Bill Clinton "the greatest leader in the free world." Riordan's counter ads highlighted that Jones had also contributed money to Davis. By late February 2002, Riordan's strong lead in the Republican primary had begun to slip. In the previous months of the campaign, Riordan focused his ads and energies on campaigning against Gray Davis and defending himself from Davis' attack ads.

Davis' negative ads against Riordan appear to have contributed to Riordan's defeat in the Republican primary by the more staunchly conservative candidate Bill Simon.

Primary results
Final results from the Secretary of State of California.

Democratic

Republican

Libertarian

Others

General election

Campaign
Davis was re-elected in the November 2002 general election following a long and bitter campaign against Simon, marked by accusations of ethical lapses on both sides and widespread voter apathy. Simon was also hurt by a financial fraud scandal that tarnished his reputation.  Davis' campaign featured several negative ads that highlighted Simon's financial fraud scandal. Simon attacked Davis for supposedly fundraising in the Lieutenant Governor's office during his time as Lt. Governor, but the attack backfired when it turned out the photograph had been instead taken in a private home in Santa Monica. The 2002 gubernatorial race was the most expensive in California state history with over $100 million spent. Davis' campaign was better financed; Davis had over $26 million in campaign reserves more than Simon in August 2002. Davis won re-election with 47.3% of the vote to Simon's 42.4%. The Simon-Davis race led in the lowest turnout percentage in modern gubernatorial history, allowing for a lower than normal number of signatures required for a recall. Davis won the election but the majority of the voters disliked Davis and did not approve of his job performance.

Predictions

Polling

Results

Results breakdown

Notes

References

External links
 Election Day results by county
 Official results 2002 General Election
 Certified list of candidates

2002 United States gubernatorial elections
Gubernatorial
2002